The Aiguille des Angroniettes is a mountain of the Pennine Alps, located on the border between Switzerland and Italy. It lies on the main Alpine watershed, west of the Grand Golliat.

References

External links
 Aiguille des Angroniettes on Hikr

Mountains of the Alps
Mountains of Valais
Mountains of Aosta Valley
Italy–Switzerland border
International mountains of Europe
Mountains of Switzerland
Two-thousanders of Switzerland